Forever... is the debut full-length studio album by the Canadian melodic death metal band Quo Vadis. It was released on April 10, 1996. The last track is taken from the Quo Vadis Demo.

Track listing
All music written by Quo Vadis.

Personnel
Quo Vadis
Arie Itman – guitars, vocals, violin, solo on tracks 1, 7, 8
Bart Frydrychowicz – guitars, vocals, acoustic guitar, solo on tracks 1, 2, 6
Remy Beauchamp – bass
Yanic Bercier – drums, backing vocals

Guest musicians
Corelli - violin on Carpe Deum
Stepehen Henry - scream on "Legions of the Betrayed"
Sebrina Lipari - soprano on track 10

References

1996 debut albums
Quo Vadis (band) albums